Governor Harding may refer to:

John Harding, 1st Baron Harding of Petherton (1896–1989), Governor of Cyprus from 1955 to 1957 officer
William L. Harding (1877–1934), 22nd Governor of Iowa, from 1917 to 1921

See also
Governor Hardinge (disambiguation)